The Pakistan Muslim League (Nawaz) (  PML(N) or PML-N) is a centre-right and liberal conservative political party in Pakistan. Alongside the Pakistan Tehreek-e-Insaf (PTI) and Pakistan Peoples Party (PPP), it is one of the three major political parties of the country. The party was founded by former Prime Minister Nawaz Sharif after the dissolution of Islamic Democratic Alliance in 1993. The party's platform is generally conservative, which involves supporting free markets, deregulation, lower taxes and private ownership. Although the party historically supported social conservatism, in recent years, the party’s political ideology and platform has become more liberal on social and cultural issues.

One of several continuing factions of the original Muslim League, the seeds of the party were sown following the 1985 Elections when the Prime Minister of Pakistan Muhammad Khan Junejo organised the supporters of President Zia-ul-Haq's dictatorship into a single party, known as the Pakistan Muslim League. After President Zia's death in 1988, under the leadership of Fida Mohammad Khan, a large faction split away from the Junejo-led Pakistan Muslim League, and formed a conservative alliance with various right-wing and Islamist political parties, called the Islamic Democratic Alliance. The alliance formed a government in 1990 under the leadership of Nawaz Sharif. In 1993, the alliance dissolved and the party assumed its current shape, branding itself as the "Nawaz" faction of the Pakistan Muslim League, in contrast to the "Junejo" faction.

After its foundation, the PML-N, along with the People's Party, dominated the two-party political system of Pakistan. However, after the 1999 coup, the party was eclipsed by its own splinter faction, the Musharraf-backed Pakistan Muslim League (Quaid), for almost a decade. PML-N regained popularity in the 2008 general elections, when it was elected as the principal opposition party. It returned to power following the elections of 2013, with Sharif elected as the Prime Minister for an unprecedented third term. The party however faced a major setback following the disqualification of Prime Minister Nawaz Sharif in 2017. The situation was worsened when Sharif and his daughter Maryam were sentenced to imprisonment on charges of corruption, however their respective sentences were later suspended.

The party lost both the centre and the provincial government of its stronghold Punjab, to PTI in the 2018 elections. As of 2022, it is the main governing party in Parliament under the leadership of Sharif's younger brother Shehbaz.

History

Breakaway from the original PML

Upon the creation of Pakistan and departure of the English Crown in 1947, the All-India Muslim League (AIML) became the Muslim League, which was now led by Prime Minister Liaquat Ali Khan. After the assassination of Prime Minister Ali Khan, the Muslim League struggled to revive itself, eventually losing control of East Pakistan in legislative elections to the Left Front. Internal disagreement over the party's direction, lack of a political program, motivation for public reforms, and inadequate administrative preparations and mismanagement all led to the public decline of the party. With the Socialist Party, the Muslim League struggled for its survival while facing the Republican Party and Awami League. The martial law imposed in 1958 eventually outlawed all political parties in the country.

The foundation and ground base of the PML-N lies with the Pakistan Muslim League, which was founded in 1962 as an enriched conservative project derived from the defunct Muslim League. The PML was presided over by Fatima Jinnah, who actively participated in presidential elections held in 1965 against Ayub Khan. After Fatima Jinnah's death, the PML was led by Nurul Amin, a Bengali leader, who deepened its role in West Pakistan.

On a nationalist and conservative platform, the party engaged in political campaigns against the leftist Pakistan Peoples Party and the Bengali nationalist party, the Awami League, in the general elections held in 1970. It managed to secure only two electoral seats in the East Pakistan parliament and only ten in the National Assembly of Pakistan. In spite of its limited mandate, Nurul Amin became the Prime Minister and Vice-President of Pakistan — the only figure to have been appointed as Vice-President. The PML government was short-lived and soon its government fell in the aftermath of the Indo-Pakistani War of 1971. The PML-N is ideologically close to the military and holds common beliefs on national security.

The list below shows the well-known breakaway factions and their relationships with the military, although many minor factions have existed throughout Pakistani history:

Electoral history

The Pakistan Muslim League went into a political abyss after the death of Nurul Amin and during the PPP government of Prime Minister Zulfikar Ali Bhutto. It made a strong comeback in response to Bhutto's nationalisation program in the 1970s. Influential young activists, including Nawaz Sharif, Javed Hashmi, Zafar-ul-Haq, and Shujaat Hussain, ascended as the leaders of the party and started their political career through the Muslim League.

The party became an integral part of the nine-party alliance, PNA, against the PPP, and campaigned against the PPP in the 1977 general elections. They campaigned on a right-wing platform and raised conservative slogans in the 1977 general elections. The PML, including Sharif and Hussain, were a conglomerate of diverse views and had provided large capital for the Muslim League's financial expenses. It was at this time that the party was revived and joined the anti-Bhutto PNA with Pir Pagara, an influential Sindhi conservative figure, as its elected president.

After the martial law of 1977, the party reassessed itself and saw the rise of the powerful oligarch bloc led by Zahoor Illahi, who was the main PML leader. After the 1984 referendum, President Zia-ul-Haq had become the country's elected president. During the 1985 general election, a new PML-N emerged on the country's political scene. The party had supported the presidency of Zia-ul-Haq and won his support to appoint Mohammad Khan Junejo to the office of Prime Minister. Nawaz Sharif had won the favour and support of President Zia-ul-Haq, who approved his appointment as Chief Minister of Punjab Province in 1985.

1988 general elections

The modern history of the party began during the 1988 parliamentary elections, when the Pakistan Muslim League, led by former prime minister Mohammed Khan Junejo, split into two factions: one was led by Fida Mohammad Khan and Nawaz Sharif, the then chief minister of Punjab Province, and the other by Junejo (who later founded the Pakistan Muslim League (F)).

In 1988, the Pakistan Muslim League (N) was founded and established by Fida Mohammad Khan, an original Pakistan Movement activist, who became the party's founding president, whilst Nawaz Sharif became its first secretary-general. The party is not the original Muslim League, but is accepted as its continuing legal successor.

At the time of the 1988 elections, the PML was part of the eight-party Islamic Democratic Alliance (IDA), which had contained the right-wing conservative mass as one entity against the left-wing circles, led by the Pakistan Peoples Party (PPP). The general elections of 1988 marked the emergence of the Pakistan Peoples Party's as the single largest political party, with its election to 94 of 237 seats in the state parliament. The IDA occupied 55 seats, but an influential leader, Nawaz Sharif, chose to serve the Chief Minister of Punjab Province. With Benazir Bhutto elevated to the post Prime Minister of Pakistan, the IDA nominated Abdul Wali Khan as a compromise candidate for opposition leader in the state parliament. Within 20 months, tales of bad governance and corruption plagued the Pakistan Peoples Party's government. Finally, in 1990, President Ghulam Ishaq Khan charged the PPP government with corruption and lack of governance and dismissed the National Assembly and the first Bhutto government.

1990 general elections

The PML-N was still part of the Islami Jamhoori Ittehad (IDA) and participated, under the leadership of Nawaz Sharif, in the 1990 general elections. The IDA competed against the leftist alliance, known as the People's Democratic Alliance (PDA), which had contained the Pakistan Peoples Party and the TeI. The elections resulted in the victory of IDA, with Nawaz Sharif becoming Prime Minister. Through IDA, the conservative forces under Sharif had a chance to form a national government for the first time in the history of Pakistan. With Sharif taking office, his ascendancy also marked a transition in the political culture of Pakistan – a power shift from control by the traditional feudal aristocracy to the growing class of modern and moderate entrepreneurs. For the first time, Sharif launched privatisation and economic liberalisation policy measures, and his economic team actually implemented some of the serious economic liberalisation and privatisation measures previous governments had merely talked about.

Election results also showed liberals, the MQM, emerging as the third major party with 15 seats. For the first time in the history of the country, Sharif allowed foreign money exchange to be transacted through private money changers. While internationally acclaimed, his policies were condemned by the PPP. Benazir Bhutto mounted pressure on President Ghulam Ishaq Khan, who dismissed the IDA government on 18 April 1993. The PML-N appealed to the Supreme Court, which then restored Sharif's government on 26 May. The country's armed forces and the military leadership attempted to negotiate with Sharif and get him to step down. This culminated in the resignation of Nawaz Sharif, and President Ghulam Ishaq Khan was also removed from office.

1993 elections and opposition

The PML-N gained national prominence in the 1993 parliamentary elections and occupied 73 seats in the state parliament. The party asserted its role as opposition to the Pakistan Peoples Party. The PML-N charged Benazir Bhutto with corruption, stagnation, and endangering national security. The PPP also suffered due to internal factions, one of which was led by Murtaza Bhutto. The controversial murder of Murtaza Bhutto by Sindh Police and the pressure on MQM further weakened Benazir Bhutto. The PML-N and Sharif himself were shocked when they learned the news of Benazir Bhutto's dismissal. An ironic aspect of this dismissal was that it was prompted by the then-President Farooq Leghari, a trusted lieutenant of Benazir, who sent her to the presidency as a safeguard for the PPP's government after the office was vacated by Ghulam Ishaq Khan. During that movement, Nawaz Sharif travelled through the length and breadth of Pakistan. He also embarked on a train march from Lahore to Peshawar as part of his campaign to oust Benazir.

During this time, the party was among the closest to the civil bureaucracy and the Pakistan Armed Forces, and had close ties and influence in the Pakistan Armed Forces' appointments as well as their military strategies.

1997 elections and power politics

The Pakistan Muslim League (N) struck its remarkable, biggest, and most notable achievement in the 1997 parliamentary elections, held on 3 February 1997. It secured a two-thirds majority in the Pakistan Parliament, the only political party to have gained a two-thirds majority since the country's independence in 1947. During this time, the PML-N was the largest conservative party, with its members occupying 137 seats out of 207, roughly 66.2%. In 1997, the party secured its win with an overwhelming mandate, with only a small opposition. On 18 February 1997, when Nawaz Sharif obtained a vote of confidence, the Pakistan Muslim League assumed the government of Pakistan. Nawaz Sharif allowed Benazir Bhutto to hold the office of Leader of the Opposition, though the PML-N held control of the state parliament. The PML-N government passed the Thirteenth and the Fourteenth Amendments to the Constitution of Pakistan to stabilize its mandate and strengthen its position.

In 1998, the law and order situation came under the PML-N's control and economic recovery was also secured. A number of constitutional amendments were made to make the country a parliamentary democracy. In May 1998, the PML-N government led by Prime Minister Nawaz Sharif ordered six nuclear tests, in response to Indian nuclear tests. The tests were extremely popular and PML-N's image and prestige rose to a record level at home. However, in 1998, the PML-N government effectively dismissed general Jehangir Karamat (see Dismissal of General Jehangir Karamat), which ruined its public ratings, but marked a perception of the civilian control of the military. This type of power politics and the repeated dismissals of military leaders soured the party's relations with the Pakistan Armed Forces and its public ratings gradually went down.

Despite its heavy public mandate, serious disagreements appeared within the party. Finally, the 1999 coup d'état ended the PML-N's government. Controversially, in 1999, the party was significantly divided, further affecting Nawaz Sharif's trial in military court. No massive protests were held by the party; its leaders remained silent and remained supportive towards the military action against Nawaz Sharif. In 2001, the party was further divided by factionalism. Dissenters formed the Pakistan Muslim League, later called Pakistan Muslim League (Quaid-e-Azam) (or PML-Q), which became allies of then president Pervez Musharraf. In 2001, the Muslim League (Nawaz) formally adopted the name of Pakistan Muslim League-Nawaz (PML-N), also known as PML(N).

2002 general elections

As a result of the Kargil War with India, the PML-N government had generated frustration within the party and a secret splinter group inside the party united on a one-point agenda with all the opposition parties in 1999 to remove Prime Minister Nawaz Sharif from office. This resulted in a military coup d'état. The Supreme Court validated the coup and gave General Pervez Musharraf three years to hold general elections. After deposing Sharif's government, the party split into several groups and its size shrunk as many of its members decided to defect to the splinter political bloc. Many of its most influential members, sponsors, and financiers came to defect to the new group that was sympathetic to Pervez Musharraf. This splinter group emerged as the Pakistan Muslim League (Q), which registered itself as a political party with the Election Commission. Sharif was removed from the party's presidency and the position was handed over to Dr. Kalsoum Nawaz, wife of Sharif. With Nawaz Sharif exiled to Saudi Arabia, the party's presidency was handed over to Javed Hashmi, and the party began to reassert itself in the coming elections. They campaigned all over the country and competed in the 2002 general elections for the state parliament. The election polls announced the victory of the Pakistan Muslim League (Q) and the liberals, MQM, with PML-Q retaining the majority in the state parliament and brutally defeating the PML-N.

During the 2002 Pakistani general election, the PML-N performed poorly, only winning 9.4% of the popular vote and gaining seats for only 14 out of 272 elected members, the worst defeat since its inception in 1988. Hashmi was removed from the party's presidency after his controversial remarks towards the country's armed forces. In an indirect party election, Shahbaz Sharif was elected as the party's new president, and the party's leadership shifted its base to London, England. In 2006, the party signed a cooperative declaration with its rival Pakistan Peoples Party to outline and promote a new democratic culture in the country. Known as the Charter of Democracy, the document was signed by Nawaz Sharif and Benazir Bhutto in London, and they announced their opposition to Musharraf and Shaukat Aziz. In the 2008 general election, the party won urban votes and dominated the provisional assembly of Punjab Province. They secured a total of 91 seats in the state parliament, just second to the Pakistan Peoples Party, which won 121 seats, and the parties agreed on forming a coalition government. The PML-N called for the impeachment of President Pervez Musharraf, and successfully ousted him from the presidency and exiled him to the United States in 2008. However, before long, Nawaz Sharif announced his support for and leadership of the Lawyers' Movement to restore the suspended famed Chief Justice Iftikhar Muhammad Chaudhry in 2008. In 2011, the PML-N established a branch in Kashmir Province to participate in Kashmir's general elections.

2008 parliamentary election

After returning to Pakistan, the PML-N contested the 2008 general election, demanding a restoration of the judges sacked under the emergency rule put in place by President Pervez Musharraf, and the removal of Musharraf as President. After the assassination of Benazir Bhutto, Sharif announced that the PML-N would boycott the polls, but after some time and conversations with the co-chairman of the PPP, Asif Ali Zardari, Nawaz announced that the party would run in the polls and began to rally in the Punjab areas. On 18 February 2008, after the polls were closed and the results had been announced, the PML-N gained 68 seats in the National Assembly, just behind the PPP. They announced that they would have discussions on forming a coalition with the PPP, which would get half the seats in the 342 seat Parliament. In a press conference on 19 February, Nawaz called for President Pervez Musharraf to step down. Nawaz and Zardari agreed on forming a coalition, and Nawaz announced that he and his party gave the PPP the right to choose the next Prime Minister.

On 13 May 2008, the PML-N ministers resigned from the government due to a disagreement related to the reinstatement of the judges. Nawaz said that the PML-N would support the government without participating in it. Zardari, hoping to preserve the coalition, told Prime Minister Yousaf Raza Gilani to reject the resignations.

On 27 June 2008, the Pakistan Muslim League-Nawaz (PML-N) and the Pakistan Peoples Party (PPP) won three and two by-election seats respectively, in the national parliament. Polls were postponed for the sixth seat in Lahore due to Nawaz Sharif's eligibility contest. A court ruled he was ineligible due to an old conviction, amid a government appeal in the Supreme Court, which was slated to hear the case on 30 June, thus postponing the vote in the constituency. The two parties also won 19 of 23 provincial assembly seats where by-elections were held. The results did not affect the 18 February general election results in which Benazir Bhutto's PPP won 123 seats in the 342-seat National Assembly, and Sharif's party came second with 91, while Pervez Musharraf's party came a poor third, with 54 seats. Sharif's Pakistan Muslim League (Nawaz) won eight provincial assembly seats, while the PPP won seven provincial seats. On 25 August 2008, Nawaz Sharif announced that Saeeduzzaman Siddiqui would be Pakistan Muslim League (N) nominee to replace Pervez Musharraf as President of Pakistan.

2013 general elections
During its election campaign for the 2013 general elections, the party competed against its arch-rival, the PPP, and another centrist party, the PTI. In an unofficial count, the party secured the qualified majority in the state parliament, the Punjab Assembly, and the Balochistan Assembly; it is yet the only party to have secured respectable seats and representation on provisional assemblies of Sindh and Khyber Pakhtunkhwa. The leader of PML-N, Nawaz Sharif, won a third term as Prime Minister of Pakistan, the first time this had happened in the history of the country.

2018 general elections
The 2018 Pakistani general election was majorly contested between PML-N and PTI. While PML-N retained its position in central Punjab it faced major setbacks in southern and northern Punjab. It obtained 64 seats in the National Assembly of Pakistan and 165 seats in the Punjab assembly. While it does not have mentionable shares in  Sindh, Khyber Pakhtunkhwa and Balochistan Assembly. After the elections Shehbaz Sharif was elected as the leader of the opposition in the National Assembly of Pakistan, while his son Hamza Shahbaz was elected as Leader of the Opposition of Punjab (Pakistan).  
PML-N became part of the opposition alliance Pakistan Democratic Movement, successfully moved No-confidence motion against Imran Khan and removed him from office on 10 April 2022, and Shehbaz Sharif became Prime Minister of Pakistan. Subsequently, the nonconfidence movement was launched in the Provincial Assembly of Punjab on 16, April 2022, and Hamza Shahbaz became Chief Minister of Punjab.

Election campaigns

National Assembly elections

Senate of Pakistan Elections

Punjab Assembly Elections 

 In the 2008 elections, the PML (N) and the PPP formed a coalition government, with PML (N) as the senior party and Shehbaz Sharif as Chief Minister of Punjab. However, in 2011, the PPP was expelled from this coalition.

Balochistan Assembly Elections

KPK Assembly Elections

Azad Kashmir Legislative Assembly Elections

Gilgit-Baltistan Assembly Elections

Structure

The major function of the General Council Meeting (or Central Working Committee) is to elect presidents and secretaries, while it is also responsible for promoting PML-N activities. The GCM's meetings are generally held at the Jinnah Convention Centre in Islamabad.

Nawaz Sharif was elected the President of Pakistan Muslim League (N) in 2011. The General Council Meeting raises funds and coordinates campaign strategy, and it has local committees in every province and in most large cities, counties, and legislative districts, but these have far less money and influence than the national body. The Central Secretariat and the Parliament Lodges of the Pakistan Parliament play important roles in recruiting strong state candidates.

Nawaz Sharif has been accused of corruption and involvement in smuggling large amounts of money outside the country, and he was recently revealed by the Panama Papers to have been involved in hiding money in offshore accounts and companies.

Ideology

Economic policies

The Pakistan Muslim League (N) policies include liberal conservatism, environmental conservation, national conservatism, and most importantly, economic liberalism and fiscal conservatism. Throughout its history, the Pakistan Muslim League (N) has emphasised the role of free markets and individual achievement as the primary factors behind economic prosperity, deregulation of all segments of the economic order, and the strong base of capitalism. In 1991, the PML-N's government established the National Highway Authority followed by inaugurating the M2 Motorways in 1997.

The Pakistan Muslim League (N) generally opposes labour union management and large-scale workers' unions. The party holds that "prosperous agriculture is the backbone of national prosperity and diversification of the rural economy, by expanding non-farm rural employment, is critical for the alleviation of poverty". During its federal government, the PML-N successfully privatised the major heavy industries under its planned industrial development programme.

Environmental policies

In 1997, the Environmental Protection Agency was established by the PML-N government, and its Ministry of Environment was one of the most notable government offices to protect national conservation and forestry in the country. In 1997, environmental PSAs were regularly paid for by the government to enhance and promote environmental awareness among the public.

However, the ministry's environmental policies remain a subject of ongoing controversy, often criticised for ignoring the health of the environment despite the party's declarations. The PML-N's provincial government in Punjab Province came under intense media, opposition, and public anger after failing to counter the 2011 dengue fever outbreak due to its apathy and the inadequacy of steps taken to enforce environmental awareness and regulations. Recently, the prestige of PML-N has suffered after the government's Health and Environment ministries failed to properly inspect the quality of medicines, resulting in major counterfeiting and environmental crises, which put the party's environmental and health policies in great doubt.

Science and politics
The Pakistan Muslim League (N) is credited for ordering and authorizing the country's first nuclear tests (see Chagai-I and Chagai-II) amid immense international pressure. It is also responsible for establishing the Pakistan Antarctic Programme as part of its science and technology strategy. Together with their main rival, the Pakistan Peoples Party, the Pakistan Muslim League (N) is also responsible for increasing Pakistan's nuclear deterrent as well as boosting the nation's nuclear power growth, first establishing the Chashma Nuclear Power Plant expansion as part of its nuclear policy.

Foreign policy issues
The party has been long advocated for broader and stronger relations with the United States, China, the United Kingdom, European Union, Singapore, Malaysia, and the Organisation of Islamic Cooperation, as well as India. In 1999, the party's government successfully signed the Lahore Declaration with India.

The Pakistan Muslim League (N) remains sceptical about the country's role in the war on terror, although it is firmly opposed to religious extremism and terrorism in all its manifestations. While it remains a strong supporter of the United States' financial and fiscal policies, it remains undecided about the military operations on its western frontier to curb militancy, with many PML-N intellectuals regarding the War on Terror as a campaign against Islam. During its previous tenure from 1997 to 1999, the PML-N government took a series of measures to control terrorist groups by establishing the Anti Terrorism Courts. The PML-N's leadership remains an avid supporter of Indian-held Kashmir, and numerous times it had made it clear that the party will "never compromise this long standing position on Kashmir dispute".

Leaders

Challenges and Controversies

Operation Clean-up

Nawaz Sharif, during his first tenure as prime minister of Pakistan (1990-1993), launched a military operation against his own allies in government, MQM, for allegations against the Jinnahpur conspiracy. Later, the ISPR denied any knowledge of the Jinnahpur conspiracy and separatist maps, which were highly publicized in the media prior to the operation's launch. Thousands of MQM activists were killed, its leadership arrested, and its head, Altaf Hussain, fled to exile in the UK.

Operation 1998
During his second term as prime minister (1997-1999), Nawaz Sharif again launched an operation against MQM, who were again in alliance in Sharif's government, on accusations of assassinating Hakeem Said. Due to MQM's militant activities and sectarian killings in Karachi, Nawaz Sharif was forced to end the alliance with MQM for the benefit of the nation. An elected PMLN Sindh government in alliance with MQM was dismissed and President's rule was imposed. The operation launched a new era of bloodshed in Karachi and many party leaders from MQM were arrested. Imran Farooq (MQM second in command at that time) was forced to flee Pakistan and took political asylum in the UK. Fasih Jugu, who was accused of assassination, was tortured to death by law enforcement officers. The operation resulted in major unrest as the PMLN government tried to nab the criminal elements ravaging the city of Karachi. This was one of the prime excuses the military conjured up for illegally ousting Nawaz Sharif's government in 1999 through martial law.

Plane hijacking
In 1999, Nawaz Sharif was allegedly involved in the hijacking of a plane carrying then Chief of Army Staff Pervez Musharraf as it was about to land at Karachi airport, and the control tower ordered the plane not to land in Pakistan but India instead. However, Musharraf and his loyalists had been planning a coup for months and some versions of the story claim that Musharraf orchestrated the coup from the plane and the military didn't allow the plane to land until Musharraf was assured that the military was in control of the airport. The military forced the courts to convict Sharif and sentence him to life imprisonment in 2000. General Musharraf had initially decided to hang Nawaz Sharif but under pressure from the President of the United States Bill Clinton and King Abdullah of Saudi Arabia, he decided not to go through with the plan. In 2010, The Supreme Court of Pakistan overturned Nawaz' conviction, making him eligible to run for power again.

Allegations of corruption
PMLN has been accused of corruption in revolutionary economic schemes such as the Yellow Cab Scheme, The National Debt Retirement Programme (NDRP), the Sasti Roti Scheme, and the Nandipur Power Project. More recently, an international newspaper published the Panama papers, naming Sharif's sons as among people who created offshore companies. Nawaz Sharif is accused of using corruption money to grow his assets in his business ventures and Ittefaq group. Also, Nawaz Sharif was condemned to 10 years in lockup for money laundering, including his daughter Maryam Nawaz for 7 years. On 29 September 2022, Islamabad High Court overturned the corruption conviction of Maryam Nawaz and her husband Muhammad Safdar. Maryam Nawaz is now eligible to run for election.

Panama papers case and its implications

The Panama Papers case was a landmark decision by the Supreme Court of Pakistan that disqualified the incumbent Prime Minister of Pakistan Nawaz Sharif from holding public office for life. The Supreme Court of Pakistan was petitioned by opposition politicians Imran Khan and Sheikh Rasheed, in the aftermath of the Panama Papers leak, which uncovered links between the Sharif family and eight offshore companies. The Court ordered for a Joint Investigation Team to be formed for the inquiry into allegations of money laundering, corruption and contradictory statements made by the Sharif family. On 10 July 2017, JIT submitted a 275-page report to the Supreme Court of Pakistan. The report found that Sharif, his sons and his daughter Maryam Nawaz could not justify their income nor their assets, adding that Maryam Nawaz had been proved to be a beneficial owner of Nielsen and Nescoll. The report also showed that Maryam Nawaz had falsified evidence before the Supreme Court, proven as the Calibri font used in the document did not exist at the time when documents were said to have been created. After hearing all arguments and based on evidence provided by the JIT, the Supreme Court of Pakistan announced its unanimous decision and disqualified the Prime Minister from holding public office, finding that he had been dishonest in not disclosing his employed in the Dubai-based Capital FZE company in his nomination papers.

Stemming from the JIT investigation, and based on NAB's investigations, the court sentenced Nawaz Sharif to 10 years of imprisonment in relation to the Avenfield Apartments case. The sentence also extended to his daughter Maryum Nawaz, and Son-in-Law Retired Captain Safdar, who were given 7 years and 1 year imprisonment respectively. On 29 September 2022, a Pakistani court quashed the conviction of Maryam Nawaz, the daughter of former prime minister Nawaz Sharif, in a corruption case that had seen her sentenced to seven years in jail. A two-judge panel found there was no evidence to prove the prosecution case that Maryam Nawaz abetted any corruption in buying high-end apartments in London.

In the following election, PMLN suffered a massive blow due to these corruptions charges, with a net loss of 24.35%. PMLN blamed this primarily on alleged vote rigging and administrative malpractices. However, Election Commission of Pakistan (ECP) outright rejected such reports and stated that the elections were conducted fair and free. The European Union Election Observation Mission said that no rigging had been found during the election, and polling was termed to be "transparent".

Allegations of treachery 
Nawaz gave an interview to Dawn News on 12 May 2018 in which he said that non-state actors from Pakistan were involved in the Mumbai terrorist attacks in 2008. A spokesman for Sharif said that Indian media had twisted his statement to make it seem like he had suggested that the state of Pakistan endorsed and was directly involved in the attacks. A National Security Council meeting was called by the Pakistan Army which declared the allegations were based on lies and misconception without specifically naming Sharif.

See also

 Muhammad Ali Jinnah
 Nawaz Sharif
 Maryam Nawaz
 Cold War
 Right-wing politics in Pakistan
 Liaquat Ali Khan
 Pakistan Movement
 Pakistan–United States relations

References

General bibliography

External links

 

 
1993 establishments in Pakistan